Plateros lictor is a species of net-winged beetle in the family Lycidae.  It is found in North America.

References

Further reading

 
 
 

Lycidae